James Tod Aitken (23 July 1882 – 8 August 1915) was an Australian rules footballer who played with Geelong in the Victorian Football League.

Family
The son of David Aitken (1843–1907), and Ellen Louisa Aitken (1844–1918), née Tod, James Tod Aitken was born at  "Hopkins Hill", Chatsworth, Victoria (near Hexham, Victoria) on 23 July 1882.

Education
He was educated at Melbourne Grammar School (1895–1899), passing the University Matriculation Examination in 1899. He played cricket with the school's First XI and football with the school's First XVIII from 1897 to 1899.

Football
He played a single game for the Geelong First XVIII in the VFL competition, against St Kilda on 13 June 1903. It seems that he was selected to play against Carlton the following week, but he did not play.

Military service
Employed as a wool clerk with the New Zealand Loan and Mercantile Agency Company, Ltd., he enlisted in the First AIF on 15 March 1915, and served overseas with the 5th Australian Infantry Battalion.

Death
He was killed in action near Lone Pine at Gallipoli, Ottoman Turkey on 8 August 1915.

He was buried at the Shrapnel Valley Commonwealth War Graves Commission Cemetery, near Gallipoli, Turkey.

See also
 List of Victorian Football League players who died in active service

Footnotes

References

 Dillon, Leigh, "Geelong's Anzac Legends", AFL.com.au, 27 May 2003.
  
 Main, J. & Allen, D., "Aitken, James", p. 13 in Main, J. & Allen, D., Fallen – The Ultimate Heroes: Footballers Who Never Returned From War, Crown Content, (Melbourne), 2002. 
 World War One Nominal  Roll, Private James Tod Aitken (2105), collection of the Australian War Memorial.
 World War One Embarkation Roll, Private James Tod Aitken (2105), collection of the Australian War Memorial.
 World War One Service Record: Private James Tod Aitken (2105), National Archives of Australia.
 Australian Casualties: 77th List Issued: Killed in Action: Victoria, The Argus, (Tuesday, 14 September 1915), p.5.
 Roll of Honour Circular: Private James Tod Aitken (2105), collection of the Australian War Memorial.
 Roll of Honour: Private James Tod Aitken (2105), Australian War Memorial.
 Private James Tod Aitken (2105), Commonwealth War Graves Commission.

External links

 

1882 births
1915 deaths
Australian rules footballers from Victoria (Australia)
Geelong Football Club players
Australian military personnel killed in World War I
People educated at Melbourne Grammar School
Burials at Shrapnel Valley Commonwealth War Graves Commission Cemetery
Military personnel from Victoria (Australia)